Gail Michelle Jonson (born 4 April 1965 in Hamilton, New Zealand) is a former medley and butterfly swimmer from New Zealand, who won a bronze medal in the women's 4 × 100 m freestyle relay at the 1982 Commonwealth Games. She also represented her native country at 1984 Summer Olympics.

References
 New Zealand Olympic Committee

1965 births
Living people
Olympic swimmers of New Zealand
New Zealand female butterfly swimmers
New Zealand female medley swimmers
Swimmers at the 1984 Summer Olympics
Sportspeople from Hamilton, New Zealand
New Zealand female swimmers
Commonwealth Games bronze medallists for New Zealand
Swimmers at the 1982 Commonwealth Games
Commonwealth Games medallists in swimming
20th-century New Zealand women
21st-century New Zealand women
Medallists at the 1982 Commonwealth Games